Anwarul Islam (known as Baby Islam; 1931 – 24 May 2010) was a Bangladeshi cinematographer and film director. He won the Bangladesh National Film Award for Best Cinematography for the film Charitraheen (1975).

Early life and education
Islam was born in 1931 in Murshidabad, West Bengal to Abdul Hossain Biswas and Motaharun Nessa. He went to a missionary school in Sealdah and moved to Cathedral Mission High School. He matriculated in 1945 before attending Bangabasi College, under the University of Calcutta.

Career
Islam started his career as the assistant of Bengali film director Ajoy Kar. In 1956, he joined as a senior photographer at the Information Department in Dhaka. He served as the general manager of Film Development Corporation (FDC).

Islam was the cinematographer of notable films including Harano Sur, Bor Didi, Saptapadi, Saat Paake Bandha and Kabuliwala. He worked with filmmaker Ritwik Ghatak on two films, Titash Ekti Nadir Naam and Jukti Takko Aar Gappo.

He received the Meril-Prothom Alo Lifetime Achievement Award in 2009 for his outstanding contribution to the Bangladeshi Film Industry.

Filmography
Cinematographer
 Barjatri (1951, assistant camera)
 Harano Sur (1957, assistant cinematographer)
 Akash Ar Mati (1959)
 Surja Snan (1962)
 Nawab Sirajuddaula (1967)
 Nil Akasher Niche (1969)
 Ka Kha Ga Gha Umo (1970)
 Titash Ekti Nadir Naam (1973)
 Jukti Takko Aar Gappo (1974/1977)
 Charitraheen (1975)
 Noyoner Alo (1984)
 Obhijan (1984)
 Premik (1985)
 Bor Didi
 Saptapadi
 Saat Paake Bandha
 Kabuliwala
 Ekattorer Jishu (Jesus '71)

Director
Tanha (1964)
Charitraheen (1975)

References

External links
 

1931 births
2010 deaths
People from Murshidabad district
Bangabasi College alumni
University of Calcutta alumni
Film directors from West Bengal
Cinematographers from West Bengal
Bangladeshi film directors
Bengali film directors
Bengali film cinematographers
Best Cinematographer National Film Award (Bangladesh) winners
Meril-Prothom Alo Lifetime Achievement Award winners